The Australian Computer Museum Society Inc, (ACMS) is a society dedicated to the preservation of the history of computing in Australia, including software, hardware, operating systems and literature. ACMS was registered and is a charitable institution which relies on memberships and donations to operate. Established in 1994, their members have since amassed a large number of unique devices designed and built by Australians.

References

Organisations based in Sydney
Organizations established in 1994
Historical societies of Australia
Information technology organizations based in Oceania